Trifković is a Serbian surname.

At least 130 individuals with the surname died at the Jasenovac concentration camp.

It may refer to:

Damjan Trifković (born 1987), Slovenian professional footballer
Srđa Trifković (born 1954), Serbian-American author
Kosta Trifković (1843-1875), Serbian writer and comediographer

See also
Tripković, a surname

References

Serbian surnames